Serropalpus is a genus of beetles belonging to the family Melandryidae.

The species of this genus are found in Europe, Japan and America.

Species:
 Serropalpus barbatus (Schaller, 1783)
 Serropalpus coxalis Mank, 1939

References

Melandryidae